Li Chun Yip is a former Hong Kong professional footballer who played as a midfielder.

Club career

Early career
Li played his first league match for Rangers. He was a member of the Hong Kong national under-23 football team. Subsequently, he moved to Instant-Dict.

After Instant-Dict was disbanded, Li joined Happy Valley. In 2004, he was also called up for the Hong Kong national football team.

In 2006, he moved to Citizen, but due to a serious injury, his contract was not renewed at the end of the season.

Telecom
In 2007, Li gave up being a professional footballer and went to work for PCCW. He played amateur football in the Hong Kong Third Division League for Telecom. He was too good at this level and scored 28 goals in two seasons.

Li scored 19 goals in the 2007–08 season to finish second in the goal scorers chart.。

Happy Valley
In the 2009–10 season, Happy Valley recruited Li and appointed him as the club's captain.

Tai Po
After Happy Valley was relegated, Li joined Tai Po. He scored 4 goals for his new club in his first four games, 3 of them are free kicks, helping the team defeat fellow New Territories rivals Pegasus and Tuen Mun. Tai Po's coach Cheung Bo Chun also claimed his performances have been phenomenal.

References

1981 births
Living people
Hong Kong First Division League players
Hong Kong Rangers FC players
Citizen AA players
Happy Valley AA players
Tai Po FC players
Footballers at the 2002 Asian Games
Association football midfielders
Hong Kong footballers
Asian Games competitors for Hong Kong